The Ireland cricket team toured Scotland in 2009. They played two One Day Internationals and an Intercontinental Cup match against Scotland.

Intercontinental Cup Match

ODI series

1st ODI

2nd ODI

2009 in cricket
Scot
2009 in Scottish cricket
Scotland
International cricket tours of Scotland
International cricket competitions in 2009